The Paramount Fine Foods Centre, formerly the Hershey Centre, is a multi-purpose sports and entertainment complex located in Mississauga, Ontario, Canada. Its current name was adopted on July 1, 2018, following a new naming rights agreement with Mississauga-based restaurant chain Paramount Fine Foods.

History

First opened in 1998 as the Hershey Centre, the complex is located on Rose Cherry Place, which was named after the late wife of Don Cherry, founder and former owner of the Mississauga IceDogs hockey team. The closest major intersection is Kennedy Road and Matheson Boulevard East. In 2007, a new multi-sport facility called SportZone opened just to the north of the main bowl. It houses a full-size indoor soccer field, a full size FIBA basketball court, a gymnastics facility, and two outdoor soccer fields.

The centre is currently the home arena for the Mississauga Steelheads of the Ontario Hockey League (ice hockey) and Raptors 905 of the NBA G League (basketball). It previously housed the Mississauga IceDogs (ice hockey) from 1998 to 2007, the Mississauga Power (basketball) from 2011 to 2015, the Toronto ThunderHawks of the National Professional Soccer League from 2000 to 2001, and the Mississauga MetroStars of the Major Arena Soccer League (indoor soccer) from 2018 to 2019. It has also been the venue for numerous musical acts, including The Tragically Hip, Green Day, The White Stripes, Hatebreed, and Chinese superstar Joker Xue.

Major events

Hockey
Along with being the home of Mississauga's OHL teams since its opening, it has hosted several hockey events. In the year 2000 the Hershey Centre hosted the OHL All-Star Classic as well as the IIHF Women's World Hockey Championship. The OHL Championship Series for the J. Ross Robertson Cup has been held at the facility in 2004, 2011 and 2017. In May 2011 the Mississauga St. Michael's Majors hosted the 2011 Memorial Cup. The Saint John Sea Dogs defeated Mississauga in the Final 3–1.

Basketball
The National Basketball League of Canada announced that the Oshawa Power would relocate to Mississauga and play as the Mississauga Power at the Hershey Centre starting in the 2013–14 season.

The Toronto Raptors announced that beginning in the 2015–16 season, they would have a team in the NBA Development League in Mississauga and play as the Raptors 905 at the Hershey Centre. The 905 displaced the Power and the NBLC team ceased operations. In 2017 and 2018 the Raptors 905 hosted both the NBA G League Showcase as well as the G League Finals at the arena.

Figure skating
The arena has hosted the Skate Canada International figure skating competition, part of the ISU Grand Prix of Figure Skating series in 2000, 2003, 2011 and in 2016. The venue is also host to this competition in October 2022.

It hosted the Canadian Figure Skating Championships for the first time in 2013 and again in 2020.

2015 Pan and Parapan American Games

During the 2015 Pan American Games, it hosted the four combative sports of judo, karate, taekwondo and wrestling. During that time the centre was temporarily renamed the Mississauga Sports Centre due to naming rights. The venue also hosted the parapan sports of goalball, powerlifting and it also featured the debut of wheelchair rugby.

Other events
It was the venue for the inaugural 2002 Heritage Cup, an international indoor lacrosse tournament. The North American Roller Hockey Championships finals were held at Hershey Centre in July 2006, 2009 and 2013. The centre hosted the 2009 World Cup of Curling. A funeral for Peel Regional Police officer James Ochakovsky took place at the arena on March 9, 2010. It has also hosted the FIRST Robotics Competition, an international high school robotics competition. On September 22, 2000, it was the site of the only ECW show in Canada before the promotion's demise in 2001. On February 14, 2023, the venue will host a state funeral for former Mississauga mayor Hazel McCallion.

COVID-19 mass vaccination site 

As of May 2021 the venue is being used as a mass COVID-19 vaccination site.

Mississauga and Iceland Fields
The grounds of the Paramount Fine Foods Centre are also home to two outdoor field facilities, known as the Mississauga Fields and Iceland Fields.

See also
List of indoor arenas in Canada

References

External links

Buildings and structures in Mississauga
Basketball venues in Ontario
Indoor ice hockey venues in Ontario
NBA G League venues
Ontario Hockey League arenas
Sports venues in Ontario
Music venues in Greater Toronto Area
Venues of the 2015 Pan American Games
Venues of the 2015 Parapan American Games
Tourist attractions in Mississauga
Raptors 905
Indoor soccer venues
Sports venues completed in 1998
1998 establishments in Ontario